This is a list of flag bearers who have represented Benin at the Olympics.

Flag bearers carry the national flag of their country at the opening ceremony of the Olympic Games.

See also
Benin at the Olympics

References

Benin at the Olympics
Benin
Olympic